Alliance for Affordable Services, founded in 1981, is a national organization which uses group buying power to negotiate discounts on personal, professional and health care benefits and services for tens of thousands of members in the United States. Before 2010 it was controlled by HealthMarkets.

Services 
Continuing education is a key focus of Alliance. Specifically, Alliance supports an annual scholarship program offering merit-based scholarships to Alliance members and their legal dependents. The scholarship program started in 1996 and has awarded over $2.5 million in scholarships to help more than 1,700 high school graduates and college students pursue undergraduate degrees. The Alliance College Guide is an online resource containing information on preparing for college, selecting a campus, the admission process and tuition funding options.

Beginning in 2012, Alliance introduced the Career Education Grant (money) program to provide its members another option for postsecondary education assistance. Each $1,000 grant awarded through the program is applied toward tuition at an accredited 2-year trade or technical institution or program.

The Alliance Legislative Advocacy Program is designed to inform members, promote legislation supporting small businesses and the self-employed and provide access to tools allowing members to contact their legislators and voice their opinions.  In late 2011, Alliance supported legislation for the Small Business Innovation Research Program (SBIR) and the Small Business Technology Transfer Program (STTR) to extend federal technology research funds to small businesses.  These programs passed to provide funding for an additional six years. 

Alliance periodically hosts advocacy events around the country utilizing elected officials to facilitate discussions between elected officials and members, along with small business owners, about issues under debate in Congress.  Member surveys also support their advocacy efforts on Capital Hill. In 2009, an Alliance member survey was used by the Senate Finance Committee to help rank small business incentive ideas.

References

External links
 

Consumer organizations in the United States